Escadrille Spa.315 (originally Escadrille N.311, Escadrille N.315) was a French fighter squadron founded in February 1917, during the First World War. Assigned to the defense of the city of Belfort on the Franco/German border, it shot down 21 enemy planes while taking only two losses. On 26 October 1918, they were Mentioned in dispatches for this feat.

History
Founded in February 1917 with Nieuport fighters as Escadrille N.311, it was dissolved in June. It was reformed in VI Armee on 25 July, still with Nieuports, as Escadrille N.315. It was assigned to the defense of Belfort, France,near the German border. 

It was designated Escadrille Spa.315 on 10 July 1918, signifying that it had been re-equipped with SPAD fighters. On 26 October 1918, the Commanding General of VI Armee commended the squadron in official orders for its excellence in downing 21 German airplanes with the loss of only two French aircraft.

Commanding officers
 Capitaine Raoul Etienne

Notable members
 Lieutenant Albert Chabrier
 Maréchal des logis Gilbert Uteau

Aircraft
 Nieuports: February 1917 - 10 July 1918
 SPADs: 10 July 1918 - war's end

End notes

Reference
 Franks, Norman; Bailey, Frank (1993). Over the Front: The Complete Record of the Fighter Aces and Units of the United States and French Air Services, 1914–1918 London, UK: Grub Street Publishing. .

Squadrons of the French Service Aéronautique in World War I
Military units and formations established in 1917
Military units and formations disestablished in 1918